Hugh Nathaniel Mulzac (March 26, 1886 – January 30, 1971) was an African-Caribbean member of the United States Merchant Marine.  He earned a Master rating in 1918, which should have qualified him to command a ship, but racial discrimination prevented this from occurring until September 29, 1942.

Life and career

Early life
Hugh Nathaniel Mulzac was born March 26, 1886, on Union Island in Saint Vincent and the Grenadines (SVG). Hugh was born to Ada Roseline Dunawa who was an accomplished pianist and a woman of pure African descent; Hugh's father, Richard Mulzac, was a mulatto planter and a builder of whaling ships and schooners. Hugh’s grandfather Charles Malzac (sic), was a white man and a native of St. Kitts W.I.... The Mulzac/Malzac family were descended from a French Huguenot galley slave who escaped the sinking of the ship, ‘Notre Dame de Bonne Esperance” off the coast of Martinique in 1687. He attended the Church of England School in Kingstown, SVG which was headed by his maternal grandfather, the Rev. James Dunawa, a former student of Bishop Herbert Bree  Hugh had two older brothers Jonathon and Edward along with younger brothers Irvin, Lambi and James along with younger sisters Lavinia and Una.

Early career 
Mulzac's life at sea started immediately after high school when he served on British schooners. He was sent to Swansea Nautical College in Wales to train for his ship masters license. In 1918, Hugh Mulzac emigrated to the United States. Within two years he had earned his shipping master's certificate, the first ever issued to an African American. He joined with Marcus Garvey's Universal Negro Improvement Association (UNIA) and served as a Captain on the SS Yarmouth of the Black Star Line. However, disagreements with the UNIA lead to his resignation in 1921.

For the next two decades, the only shipboard work Mulzac could get was in the steward's departments on several shipping lines.

World War II
He refused at first because the crew was to be all black. He insisted on an integrated crew, stating, "Under no circumstances will I command a Jim Crow", and the authorities relented. With this, he became famous for being the first ever black captain, the first black man to obtain a ships masters license and the first black man ever to command a fully integrated vessel. Under his command, over 18,000 troops were transported around the world, and additionally "carrying vital war supplies such as tanks, aircraft and ammunition to the European front."

Captain Hugh Mulzac also played a role in the National Maritime Union. The Union included a clause that stipulated that there should be no discrimination based on color, race, political creed, religion or national origin.

After the war
After the war, Mulzac could not regain a position as captain. In 1948 he unsuccessfully filed a lawsuit against the ship's operators. In 1950 he made a bid for Queens Borough President under the American Labor Party ticket. He lost the election, having gotten 15,500 votes.

Due to his strong ties to the labor movement, he found himself blacklisted in the era of McCarthyism. At the New York state election, 1958, he ran on the Independent-Socialist ticket for New York State Comptroller.

Mulzac was a self-taught painter, and in 1958, thirty-two of his oil paintings were put on exhibit at one man show in the Countee Cullen Library in Manhattan. In 1960 a Federal Judge restored his seaman's papers and license, and at the age of 74 he was able to find work as a night mate.

Captain Mulzac died in East Meadow, New York on January 30, 1971, at the age of 84.

Personal life
On September 29, 1920, Hugh Mulzac married Miriam Aris, a native of Jamaica; they would have four children; Joyce, Una, Claire and Hugh Jr. Their daughter, Una Mulzac, was the founder of a prominent Harlem-based political and Black power-oriented bookstore, Liberation Bookstore. Hugh's nephew, John Ira Mulzac Sr., was a pilot with the Tuskegee Airmen.

In popular culture
 He was mentioned in the episode "A Nugget of History" in the television series The Suite Life of Zack & Cody on the Disney Channel.

References

Further reading

External links
 SS Booker T Washington Images at the U.S. National Archive
 Hugh Mulzac Great Americans radio program. WNYC. 1943.

1886 births
1971 deaths
African-American people in New York (state) politics
Victims of McCarthyism
United States Merchant Mariners
United States Merchant Mariners of World War II
People from Union Island
Saint Vincent and the Grenadines emigrants to the United States
American Labor Party politicians
Independent-Socialist Party politicians
20th-century African-American people